Perrona perron is a species of sea snail, a marine gastropod mollusk in the family Clavatulidae.

Description
The shell grows to a length of 25 mm. The pale yellow, fusiform shell is turreted and rather smooth. The whorls are flat, with flexuous longitudinal lines, slightly angulated round the upper part. The lower portion of the last whorl is contracted and has several regular, distant revolving ridges. The anal sinus is nearly central.

Distribution
This species occurs in the Atlantic Ocean from Gabon to North Angola.

References

 Chemnitz, Syst. Conch. Cab., 10: 278, pl. 164, figs. 1573-74

External links
 
 Walter O. "TYPE SPECIMENS OF MOLLUSCA IN THE UNIVERSITY ZOOLOGICAL MUSEUM, COPENHAGEN." Records of the Auckland Institute and Museum 11 (1974): 143–92.

perron
Gastropods described in 1791